František Doležal (born November 23, 1913, date of death unknown) was a Czech boxer who competed in the 1936 Summer Olympics for Czechoslovakia. In 1936 he was eliminated in the first round of the bantamweight class after losing his fight to Albert Barnes.

External links

1913 births
Year of death missing
Czechoslovak male boxers
Bantamweight boxers
Olympic boxers of Czechoslovakia
Boxers at the 1936 Summer Olympics
Czech male boxers